Lawrence Kestenbaum (born September 13, 1955) is an attorney, politician, and the creator and webmaster of The Political Graveyard website.

Early life and education 
Although he was born in Chicago, Illinois, Kestenbaum was raised in East Lansing, Michigan, where his father, Justin L. Kestenbaum, was a professor of history at Michigan State University.

In 1973, he graduated from East Lansing High School.  He received a bachelor's degree in economics from Michigan State University, followed by a Juris Doctor from Wayne State University in 1982.  He later studied historic preservation at Cornell University.

Academic career 
Kestenbaum was an analyst and computer lab director for Michigan State University, later becoming an academic specialist there. It was during this time that he created The Political Graveyard in 1996. He was later on staff at the University of Michigan's Institute for Social Research (ISR) Survey Research Center, and has taught historic preservation law at Eastern Michigan University.

Political career 
Kestenbaum is a Democrat.  He served as a county commissioner in Ingham County, Michigan (1983–88) and Washtenaw County, Michigan (2000–02). In 2004, he was elected as the Washtenaw County Clerk/Register of Deeds, the first Democrat in that position in 72 years.  He was unopposed for reelection in 2008, reelected in 2012, unopposed in 2016, and reelected in 2020.

Kestenbaum currently serves as co-chair of the Legislative Committee for the Michigan Association of County Clerks.

On March 22, 2014, following a U.S. District Court ruling that Michigan's ban on same sex marriage was unconstitutional, Kestenbaum was one of four Michigan county clerks to open for special hours while the ruling was in effect; his office issued marriage licenses to 74 gay and lesbian couples. His office also provided fresh same-day same-sex marriage licenses within minutes of the US Supreme Court Obergefell ruling.

Personal life 
Kestenbaum was married to Janice Gutfreund, and they have one child.  He and his former wife were active members in Reform Judaism Temple Beth Emeth in Ann Arbor, Michigan. He continues to be an active member of science fiction fandom, appearing on panels at conventions such as ConFusion.

References

External links 
Kestenbaum's personal website
Political Graveyard website
Interview with Kestenbaum (archived on 20070416)
 
 Candidate presentation at League of Women Voters forum in 2020.

1955 births
Living people
Politicians from Lansing, Michigan
Michigan State University alumni
Wayne State University alumni
Cornell University College of Architecture, Art, and Planning alumni
County officials in Michigan
Michigan lawyers
Michigan Democrats